The   is a pair of Japanese distance markers akin to a milestone, consisting of two earthen mounds flanking the route of the old Tōkaidō highway located in what is now part of the city of Toyoake, Aichi Prefecture in the Tōkai region of Japan. It was designated a National Historic Site of Japan in 1936.

Overview
During the Edo period Tokugawa shogunate established ichirizuka on major roads, enabling calculation both of distance travelled and of the charge for transportation by kago or palanquin. These mounds, denoted the distance in ri  to Nihonbashi, the "Bridge of Japan", erected in Edo in 1603. They were typically planted with an enoki or Japanese red pine to provide shelter for travelers. Since the Meiji period, most of the ichirizuka have disappeared, having been destroyed by the elements, modern highway construction and urban encroachment. In 1876, the "Ichirizuka Abolition decree" was issued by the Meiji government and many were demolished at that time. Currently, 17 surviving ichirizuka are designated as national historic sites.

In the case of the Ano ichirizuka, the mounds flank the Tōkaidō, the main highway connecting Edo with Kyoto and are located between Chiryū-juku in Mikawa Province and Narumi-juku in Owari Province. This ichirizuka was the 86th marker from Nihonbashi, and is a rare case on the Tōkaidō where both of the mounds have survived. These markers were constructed in 1604.The site is about a 15-minute walk from Zengo Station on the Meitetsu Nagoya Main Line.

See also
List of Historic Sites of Japan (Aichi)

References

External links
Toyoake city official site

Edo period
Toyoake, Aichi
Historic Sites of Japan
History of Aichi Prefecture
Owari Province
Ichirizuka